Talk About It in the Morning is a collaborative EP by American rapper Wiz Khalifa and American singer Ty Dolla $ign. It was released on March 31, 2015.

Track listing

References

Wiz Khalifa albums
Ty Dolla Sign albums
Collaborative albums
2015 EPs